The Benin Swimming Federation, is the national governing body for the sport of swimming in Benin.

In 2010, Abdon Déguénon was elected President of the Federation. He was re-elected in 2014, and again in March 2018, when he beat his challenger Leopold Zinsou by 32 votes to 30.

References

National members of the African Swimming Confederation
Sports governing bodies in Benin
Swimming in Benin
2000 establishments in Benin
Sports organizations established in 2000